Tekeyeh Taviran-e Sofla (also Romanized as Tekeyeh-ye Ţāvīrān-e Soflá; also known as Tekeyeh-ye Soflá) is a village in Sar Firuzabad Rural District, Firuzabad District, Kermanshah County, Kermanshah Province, Iran. At the 2006 census, its population was 114, in 20 families.

References 

Populated places in Kermanshah County